João Fernandes Lavrador  (1453-1501) was a Portuguese explorer of the late 15th century. He was one of the first modern explorers of the Northeast coasts of North America, including the large Labrador peninsula, which was named after him by European settlers in eastern Canada. The popular dog breed Labrador Retriever is named after the peninsula and thus by effect also bears his name. It was developed as a working breed for hunting.

Name 
Lavrador means "farmer - plower" in Portuguese but has no immediate relation to the family's activity.

Expeditions 
Lavrador was granted a patent by King Manuel I in 1498 that gave him the right to explore the part of the Atlantic Ocean as set out in the Treaty of Tordesillas.

Together with Pêro de Barcelos, Lavrador first sighted what is now known as Labrador in 1498. Lavrador also charted the coasts of Southwestern Greenland and of adjacent Northeastern North America around 1498; he reported on these observations and gave notice of them in Europe. The areas are believed to have been named island of the Labrador and land of the Labrador (modern-day Labrador), respectively, after him.

In the 1532 Wolfenbüttel map, believed to be the work of Diogo Ribeiro, along the coast of Greenland the legend was added: "As he who first sighted it was a farmer from the Azores Islands, this name remains attached to that country." For the first seven decades or so of the sixteenth century, the name Labrador was most often applied to what we know as Greenland. This name Labrador, i.e., means the land of the laborer. In the earliest maps it was designated as Terra Corterialis. The farmer referred to (lavrador in Portuguese) is believed to have been João Fernandes Lavrador. 

Upon his return from Greenland, Lavrador sailed to Bristol. He received a patent for exploration from King Henry VII. In 1501 Lavrador set sail for discovery of lands in the name of England. He was never heard from again.

Lavrador was granted title to much of the lands he had discovered and is considered the first European landowner in Labrador.

References

 
 

1505 deaths
Portuguese explorers
15th-century explorers
Portuguese explorers of North America
15th-century Portuguese people
1453 births
Maritime history of Portugal